FUB-APINACA (also known as AFUBINACA and FUB-AKB48) is an indazole-based synthetic cannabinoid that is presumed to be a potent agonist of the CB1 receptor and has been sold online as a designer drug. It is an analog of APINACA and 5F-APINACA where the pentyl chain has been replaced with fluorobenzyl.

Pharmacology
FUB-APINACA acts as a full agonist with a binding affinity of 1.06 nM at CB1 and 0.174 nM at CB2 cannabinoid receptors.

Legal status 

In the United States, FUB-APINACA was temporarily emergency scheduled by the DEA in 2019. and made a permanent Schedule I Controlled Substance nationwide on April 7, 2022. Previously, it was illegal only in Alabama (listed as FUB-AKB48).

Sweden's public health agency suggested classifying FUB-APINACA as a hazardous substance on November 10, 2014.

See also 

 5F-ADB
 5F-AMB
 AB-FUBINACA
 AB-CHFUPYCA
 AB-PINACA
 ADAMANTYL-THPINACA
 ADB-CHMINACA
 ADB-FUBINACA
 ADB-PINACA
 ADBICA
 APP-FUBINACA
 FAB-144
 MDMB-CHMINACA
 MDMB-FUBINACA
 PX-3

References 

Cannabinoids
Designer drugs
Fluoroarenes
Indazolecarboxamides